JP-8, or JP8 (for "Jet Propellant 8") is a jet fuel, specified and used widely by the US military. It is specified by MIL-DTL-83133 and British Defence Standard 91-87, and similar to commercial aviation's Jet A-1, but with the addition of corrosion inhibitor and anti-icing additives.

A kerosene-based fuel, JP-8 is projected to remain in use at least until 2025. It was first introduced at NATO bases in 1978. Its NATO code is F-34.

Usage
It was specified in 1990 by the U.S. government as a replacement for government diesel fueled vehicles.

The U.S. Air Force replaced JP-4 with JP-8 completely by the end of 1995, to use a less flammable, less hazardous fuel for better safety and combat survivability.

The U.S. Navy uses a similar formula, JP-5. JP-5 has an even higher flash point of > 140 °F (60 °C), but also a higher cost, though the U.S. Navy Seabees still use JP-8 in their construction and tactical equipment.

In addition to its use for powering aircraft, JP-8 is used as a fuel for heaters, stoves, tanks, by the U.S. military and its NATO allies as a replacement for diesel fuel in the engines of nearly all tactical ground vehicles and electrical generators,
and as a coolant in engines and some other aircraft components.  The use of a single fuel  greatly simplifies logistics.

JP-8 is formulated with an icing inhibitor, corrosion inhibitors, lubricants, and antistatic agents, and less benzene (a carcinogen) and less n-hexane (a neurotoxin) than JP-4. However, it also smells stronger than JP-4. JP-8 has an oily feel to the touch, while JP-4 feels more like a solvent.

Problems and health concerns
When used in highly supercharged diesel engines with the corresponding low compression ratio of about only 14:1 or below, JP-8 causes troubles during cold start and idling due to low compression temperatures and subsequent ignition delay because the cetane index is not specified in MIL-DTL-83133G to 40 or higher. Because lubricity to the BOCLE method is not specified in MIL-DTL-83133G, modern common-rail diesel engines can experience wear problems in high-pressure fuel pumps and injectors. Another problem in diesel engines can be increased wear to exhaust valve seats in the cylinder heads, because a maximum sulfur content is not specified in MIL-DTL-83133G. Sulfur in fuel normally contributes to a build-up of soot layers on these valve seats. According to the notes in this standard, it is intended to include a cetane index value in one of the next releases.

Workers have complained of smelling and tasting JP-8 for hours after exposure. As JP-8 is less volatile than standard diesel fuel, it remains on the contaminated surfaces for longer time, increasing the risk of exposure. JP-8 exposure has also been linked to hearing problems, but rather than being unable to hear sounds, the brain has a hard time deciphering the message. Dr. O'neil Guthrie, a research scientist and clinical audiologist with the United States Department of Veterans Affairs Loma Linda Healthcare System in California, has compared the central auditory processing disorder to dyslexia for the ears.

In 2001, Texas Tech University's Institute of Environmental and Human Health and the United States Air Force conducted an 18-month study of the health effects of JP-8 on 339 active duty personnel at six US Air Force installations. The study found that Air Force workers who were exposed to JP-8 were no more likely to seek medical attention than  workers who were not exposed to JP-8 on the job. Personnel in the high- and moderate-exposure categories self-reported greater amounts of symptoms such as headaches, dizziness, difficulty breathing, general weakness, trouble concentrating, forgetfulness, and trouble gripping things.

Variants
JP-8+100 (F-37) is a version of JP-8 with an additive that increases its thermal stability by 100 °F (a difference of 56 °C). The additive is a combination of a surfactant, metal deactivator, and an antioxidant, and was introduced in 1994 to reduce choking and fouling in engine fuel systems. The additive is known as 8Q462, or Aeroshell Performance Additive 101, is manufactured by BetzDearborn (Now GE Betz), and used at the ratio of 256 ppm, at cost of about $1 per 1000 gallons of fuel. Commercially, this additive is used in police helicopters in Tampa, Florida. JP-8+100 is also used for Canadian Forces CP-140 Aurora, CC-130 Hercules, CF-18 Hornet and the CC-115 Buffalo.

JP-8+100LT is a variant of JP-8+100, with additives to facilitate low-temperature performance. It is considered as a logistically friendly low-cost replacement of the JPTS fuel for the Lockheed U-2 airplane.

See also 
 JP-4
 JP-5
 JP-6
 JP-7
 JPTS
 Aviation fuel

References

External links 
 MIL-DTL-83133 technical specifications (includes JP-8) United States Defense Energy Support Center
 MIL-DTL-46162 referee fuel Diesel and JP-8 United States Defense Energy Support Center
 Current United States Department of Defense Fuel Prices
 JP-8 Material Safety Data Sheet from Shell US Gas and Power

Aviation fuels
1990 introductions